Alliku may refer to:

Alliku, Harju County, a village in Saue Parish, Harju County, Estonia
Alliku, Ida-Viru County, a village in Iisaku Parish, Ida-Viru County, Estonia
Rauno Alliku (born 1990), Estonian football player

See also
Allika (disambiguation)